Ekis (also Romanized as Ekīs; also known as Elīs) is a village in Qareh Naz Rural District, in the Central District of Maragheh County, East Azerbaijan Province, Iran. At the 2006 census, its population was 612, in 135 families.

References 

Towns and villages in Maragheh County